Russian Supreme League may refer to

 Russian Bandy Supreme League
 Supreme Hockey League